George St Poll (by 1499 – 1558/1559), of Louth Park, Lincoln, North Carlton, and Snarford, Lincolnshire, and Lincoln's Inn, London was an English politician.

He was a Member (MP) of the Parliament of England for Lincoln in
1542, 1545, 1547, Oct. 1553, Nov. 1554, 1555 and 1558.

References

15th-century births
1550s deaths
Members of Lincoln's Inn
People from Louth, Lincolnshire
People from Lincoln, England
English MPs 1542–1544
English MPs 1545–1547
English MPs 1547–1552
English MPs 1553 (Mary I)
English MPs 1554–1555
English MPs 1555
English MPs 1558
Serjeants-at-law (England)
People from West Lindsey District